Rosamund ( 572) was a Lombard queen. She was the daughter of Cunimund, king of the Gepids, and wife of Alboin, king of the Lombards.

Life
Rosamund was born into a kingdom in crisis, as the Gepid people had been fighting a losing battle against the Lombards since 546, firstly within the context of a Lombardic-East Roman alliance, and later against the Lombards and the Avar nomads. These wars had taken the lives of not only her grandfather king Thurisind, but also her uncle, Thurismund, both of which served to establish a long-standing hatred of the Lombards in her father, Cunimund, which he passed down to her.

This hatred was what spawned the final war of the Gepids, as Cunimund attempted to win back lost lands against the Lombards. The war, however, quickly turned, and in 567, the Gepid Kingdom would be completely subdued by a mixture of Lombard and Avar forces, her father was decapitated and she, along with many other Gepids, was taken as a prisoner of the Lombards (see Lombard–Gepid War (567)). However, in an attempt to secure a male heir and following the death of his first wife Clotsuinda of Frankia, Alboin took her as his wife. Alboin was noted for his cruelty towards her; his most famous act of cruelty was reported by Paulus Diaconus, who states that at a royal banquet in Verona, Alboin forced her to drink from the skull of her dead father (which he carried around his belt), inviting her "to drink merrily with her father".

After this, she began plotting to have her husband assassinated.  Thus, Rosamund met with the king's arms bearer and her lover, Helmichis, who suggested using Peredeo, "a very strong man", to accomplish the assassination. Peredeo refused to help, and that night mistakenly had intercourse with Rosamund, who was disguised as a servant. After learning that he had committed adultery with his king's wife, Peredeo agreed to take part in an assassination attempt in fear of the king's retribution. After the great feast, Alboin went to bed inebriated, at which point Rosamund ordered the king's sword bound to his bedpost, so that should he wake in the middle of the assassination attempt, he would be defenseless. Alboin did wake, only to find himself unarmed. He fended off his attackers temporarily with a footstool, but was killed. Due in part to the work of Paulus Diaconus, there seems to be some confusion about who actually killed Alboin, with both Helmichis and Peredeo assigned as sole murderer.

Immediately afterwards, Helmichis planned to marry Rosamund and usurp the throne by claiming kingship. However, this plan gained little support from the various duchies of the Lombard kingdom, so Rosamund, Helmichis, and Albsuinda, Alboin's daughter by his first wife, fled together to the East Roman stronghold of Ravenna with a large proportion of Alboin's private treasures.  Rosamund and Helmichis married in Ravenna, but were soon divided when Rosamund, in an attempt to curry favour, took as a lover Longinus, the exarch, who had helped them plan the murder of Alboin. At the urging of Longinus, who promised to marry her, she attempted to murder her former lover Helmichis by poisoning, handing him the drink after he had washed; however, she was instead murdered by Helmichis, who forced her to drink the poison before committing suicide by the same means.

Rosamund in later culture

Rosamund would inspire many later tragedies, based on her life, particularly in Italy, where the folk song "Donna Lumbarda" was passed down orally through the generations, inspiring later renditions of the tale.

She's a heroine of Boccaccio's De casibus virorum illustrium (book 8).

Medieval folk tales and legends developed. The first true tragedy, Giovanni Rucellai's Rosmunda, was first performed in 1525 and would serve as the basis for many later tellings of the story in the Italian language, such as Vittorio Alfieri's 1783 work of the same name and a Sam Benelli play of 1911. The conspiracy to murder Alboin also inspired the 1961/2 film Rosmunda e Alboino, aka Sword of the Conqueror etc., by Carlo Campogalliani.

In 1665 Urban Hjärne wrote a comedy in Swedish on the same matter, Rosimunda. It is the first original play in that language known to have actually been staged, as entertainment for the young Charles XI while he studied at Uppsala university.

In the English language, the story would also be considered a tragedy, albeit more often neglected than in the Italian tradition, but it was the subject of Robert Burton Rodney's mid 19th C. poem Alboin and Rosamond, and would be treated by the pre-Raphaelite poet Algernon Charles Swinburne in his 1899 work Rosamund, Queen of the Lombards.

In Meg Cabot's young adult novel series The Princess Diaries published from 2000 on, Rosimunda is renamed 'Rosagunde'. While the story of her marriage to Alboin is the same, in Cabot's re-telling she is granted Genovia by the king of Italy as a reward for killing Alboin, making her the first princess of Genovia and an ancestor to the series' protagonist Mia Thermopolis.

See also
Cleopatra VII
Theodora

Notes

External links 

Gepid people
Gothic women
Lombardic queens consort
6th-century Lombard people
6th-century Gothic people
6th-century Italian women
572 deaths
Deaths by poisoning
Murdered royalty